Uepeker (Ainu:ウエペケㇾ, old tale) are Ainu folktales, and form part of Ainu oral literature. In Sakhalin, the term "uchashkuma" is used, and in other areas the term "tuitak" is used.

Etymology 
The term u'uepekere may be a more accurate term to be used. It comes from u (mutuality prefix), ue (thereby), and pekere (bright). Ainu linguist Chiri Mashiho described the term's meaning as "mutually inquiring after news".

General 
Uepeker are short stories told as actual experiences of people of the past. According to former Ainu politician Shigeru Kayano, the stories were essentially parts of dialogue between the natural world and human morality, and were responsible for moral and other forms of education.

People 
Shigeru Kayano retold uepeker in some of his books.
Toshi Ueda is a famous reteller of uepeker.

Bibliography 
. Ainu History and Culture. Ainu Museum Poroto Kotan. Web. 01 Aug. 2016. Ainu History and Culture 
Frey, Christopher J. "Ainu Schools and Education Policy in Nineteenth-century Hokkaido, Japan." Google Books. Web. 01 Aug. 2016.

See also
Yukar

Ainu culture
Japanese folklore